Aaron Stevens may refer to:
Aaron Fletcher Stevens (1819–1887), American Civil War soldier
Aaron Dwight Stevens (1831–1860), associate of the abolitionist John Brown, executed after the raid on Harpers Ferry, West Virginia in 1859
Aaron Stevens, a wrestler born in 1982, who goes by the name of Damien Sandow in WWE
Aaron Stevens (baseball), American college baseball coach and player